The Turkey women's national under-23 volleyball team represents Turkey in international women's volleyball competitions and friendly matches under age 23 and it is ruled by the Turkish Volleyball Federation That is a part of The Federation of International Volleyball FIVB and also a part of The European Volleyball Confederation CEV.

Results

FIVB U23 World Championship
 Champions   Runners up   Third place   Fourth place

Team

Current squad

The following is the Turkish roster in the 2017 FIVB Women's U23 World Championship.

Head coach: Ataman Guneyligil

Notable players
Beyza Arıcı
Hatice Gizem Örge
Hande Baladın :  MVP 
Kübra Akman

See also
 Men's
Turkey Men's national volleyball team
Turkey Men's national volleyball team U23
Turkey Men's national volleyball team U21
Turkey Men's national volleyball team U19
 Women's
 Turkey Women's national volleyball team
Turkey Women's national volleyball team U23
Turkey Women's national volleyball team U20
Turkey Women's national volleyball team U18

References

External links
 

National women's under-23 volleyball teams
V
Volleyball in Turkey
Women's volleyball in Turkey